The Never Ending Tour is the popular name for Bob Dylan's endless touring schedule since June 7, 1988.

Background
The Never Ending Tour 1996 started on April 16 in Madison, New Jersey. The concerts mainly took place in the North-Eastern states of America, as well as four concerts in eastern Canada.

Dylan later travelled to Europe to perform a twenty-eight date tour of eleven countries and twenty-five cities. Dylan also performed at several festivals, including ‘MasterCard Masters of Music Concert for The Prince's Trust’ as well as the Pori Jazz Festival.

Shortly after finishing the European tour Dylan performed two special shows at the House of Blues in Atlanta, Georgia. Dylan later picked up the tour on October 17 in Los Angeles. The tour came to a close a month and a half later in Akron, Ohio.

There were originally plans to tour smaller club venues towards to the end of December, but these plans were shelved until the following year.

Shows

Festivals and other miscellaneous performances
This concert was a part of "Arhus Festival".
This concert was a part of "MasterCard Masters of Music Concert for The Prince's Trust".
This concert was a part of "Zeltfestival".
This concert was a part of "Pistoia Blues Festival".
This concert was a part of "Molde Jazz Festival".
This concert was a part of "Pori Jazz Festival".
This concert was a part of "Lollipop Festival".

Cancelled shows

References

External links

BobLinks – Comprehensive log of concerts and set lists
Bjorner's Still on the Road – Information on recording sessions and performances

Bob Dylan concert tours
1996 concert tours